XHSR-FM is a station in Monterrey, Nuevo León, Mexico. It broadcasts on 97.3 FM and carries the Exa FM Contemporary Hit Radio format from MVS Radio.

History
XHSR received its concession late in 1976 and was owned by the concessionaire Sistema Radio Recuerdo, S.A., managed by José Vargas Santamarina. Santamarina would go on to become a director of some of MVS's radio stations. As an MVS station, it acquired the FM Globo format, which remained until 1998, when it became Pulsar FM, changing again to Exa FM in 2000.

References

Radio stations established in 1976
1976 establishments in Mexico
Radio stations in Nuevo León
MVS Radio